The Rural Municipality of Gilbert Plains is a former rural municipality (RM) in the Canadian province of Manitoba. It was originally incorporated as a rural municipality on March 30, 1897. It ceased on January 1, 2015 as a result of its provincially mandated amalgamation with the Town of Gilbert Plains to form the Gilbert Plains Municipality.

The RM was located in the Parkland Region of the province and had a population of 834 according to the Canada 2006 Census. Part of Riding Mountain National Park was located within the southern portion of the RM.

Communities 
Ashville
Halicz
Venlaw
Zoria

See also
Gilbert Plains (electoral district)
Gilbert Plains Airport
Gilbert Plains station

References

External links 
Gilbert Plains RM, MB Community Profile
Map of Gilbert Plains R.M. at Statcan

Gilbert Plains
Populated places established in 1897
Populated places disestablished in 2015
1897 establishments in Manitoba
2015 disestablishments in Manitoba